The praxinoscope was an animation device, the successor to the zoetrope. It was invented in France in 1877 by Charles-Émile Reynaud. Like the zoetrope, it used a strip of pictures placed around the inner surface of a spinning cylinder. The praxinoscope improved on the zoetrope by replacing its narrow viewing slits with an inner circle of mirrors, placed so that the reflections of the pictures appeared more or less stationary in position as the wheel turned.  Someone looking in the mirrors would therefore see a rapid succession of images producing the illusion of motion, with a brighter and less distorted picture than the zoetrope offered.

Variations
Reynaud introduced the Praxinoscope-Théâtre in 1879. This was basically the same device, but it was hidden inside a box to show only the moving figures within added theatrical scenery. When the set was assembled inside the unfolded box, the viewer looked through a rectangular slot in the front, onto a plate with a transparent mirror surrounded by a printed proscenium. The mirror reflected a background and a floor that were printed on interchangeable cards placed on the inside of the folded lid of the box, below the viewing slot. The animated figures were printed on black strips, so they were all that was visible through the transparent mirror and appeared to be moving within the suggested space that was reflected from the background and floor cards. The set appeared with 20 strips (all based on previous standard praxinoscope strips), 12 backgrounds and a mirror intended for background effects for the swimming figure. This set also sold very well and appeared in slight variations, including a deluxe version made of thuja-wood with ebony inlays.

Reynaud mentioned the possibility of projecting the images in his 1877 patent. He presented a praxinoscope projection device at the Société française de photographie on 4 June 1880, but did not market his praxinoscope a projection before 1882. Only a handful of examples are known to still exist.

In 1888 Reynaud developed the Théâtre Optique, an improved version capable of projecting images on a screen from a longer roll of pictures. From 1892 he used the system for his Pantomimes lumineuses: a show with hand-drawn animated stories for larger audiences. It was very successful for several years, until it was eclipsed in popularity by the photographic film projector of the Lumière brothers.

The praxinoscope was copied by several other companies. Ernst Plank offered several variations, including one that was automated by a small hot air engine.

20th century revival
The Red Raven Magic Mirror and its special children's phonograph records, introduced in the US in 1956, was a 20th-century adaptation of the praxinoscope. The Magic Mirror was a sixteen-sided praxinoscopic reflector with angled facets. It was placed over the record player's spindle and rotated along with the 78 rpm record, which had a very large label with a sequence of sixteen interwoven animation frames arrayed around its center. As the record played, the user gazed into the Magic Mirror and saw an endlessly repeating animated scene that illustrated the recorded song. In the 1960s, versions of the Red Raven system were introduced in Europe and Japan under various names—Teddy in France and the Netherlands, Mamil Moviton in Italy, etc.

Etymology
The word praxinoscope translates roughly as "action viewer", from the Greek roots πραξι- (confer πρᾶξις "action") and scop- (confer σκοπός "watcher").

See also
 Electrotachyscope
 History of film
 Kinematofor
 Strobe light
 Zoetrope
 Zoopraxiscope

References

External links

A picture and further information
Praxinoscopes: Kenyon College Department of Physics
A demonstration of this and similar optical toys, including the zoetrope
The Influence of Emile Reynaud
More on Reynaud's Théåtre Optique

Audiovisual introductions in 1877
History of animation
Optical toys